Mark Harrington (born 19 May 1952) is an American-born Europe-based painter who has exhibited widely in Europe and the United States since the early 1990s.

Biography 

Mark Harrington was born in 1952 in Bakersfield, California, moving to the Bay Area during infancy. His close contact as a child with the author and critic, Allan Temko, continued until the latter's death in 2004. Harrington's father, Richard Harrington, was an architect and craftsman-builder whose influence in the rendering of materials and appreciation of architectural space was pronounced. His mother, Donna Raffety Smith, remarried in 1959 to Abstract-Expressionist painter Hassel Smith, moving with her two sons to an apple orchard near Sebastopol in Sonoma county, north of San Francisco.

The influence upon Harrington of Hassel Smith was pronounced from childhood and deepened immeasurably. The family settled in the Sebastopol area for several years, making an important sea journey for a sojourn in Mousehole, Cornwall (England) during 1962-63, then moving to Los Angeles in 1965 for one year where Harrington formed an early friendship with the painter John Altoon. The family emigrated permanently to Bristol, England in 1966.

Harrington attended art school in Sheffield (1971–75), gaining BA Hons in Sculpture with Art History. He pursued graduate studies at University of Reading (1975–77) gaining M.A. in English Literature with a dissertation on the origins of twentieth-century art criticism. He met the British German-based painter Jon Groom as a student at Sheffield.
 
After a two-year period as a stonemason in England and France (church restoration), followed by sculptural propsmaking and assistant art direction for the British Film Institute, Harrington became a lecturer and department leader at Portsmouth College of Art and Design from 1979 to 1990. During this decade he met and was influenced by the painter Sean Scully.

He established a European annexe for PCAD in Barcelona in 1989 and was resident in Catalonia until the mid-1990s. Harrington resigned from his English teaching post in 1990 and was active in painting and furniture-making at his Palo Alto studio in the north of Barcelona from 1990 to late 1994. He resumed teaching in Norway in 1994, taking a position as amanuensis and later professor for painting at Vestlandets Kunstakademi, Bergen (1994–97).

Harrington became the founding Director for Nordland Kunst og- Filmskole at Kabelvåg in the Lofoten Islands, 1997-99. He received a residency stipend from the culture department of the city of Munich in 1999-2000, at Villa Waldberta on the Starnbergersee. In 2004 he met the LA-based painter, Lucas Reiner, sharing a period of experimentation in copperplate etching.

Harrington has maintained studios in upper Bavaria over the past decade and has exhibited his paintings widely in Europe and the United States. Weserburg Museum in Bremen (Germany) and Bakersfield Museum of Art (California) gave retrospective exhibitions to Harrington's work in April–November 2011, and March–June 2012, respectively.

Work 

"Harrington imbeds multi-tonal veins of color into monochrome fields [...] investigating the intereaction of color and line [...] large-scale abstractions focus on space, pictorial depth and light."

Harrington's large-scale two-dimensional works of the 1980s and early 1990s, executed on paper-on-canvas cut from rolls, were based on the diagrammatic profile-schema of a racing cycle frame. The 5-sided figure was rendered through multiple presentations: frontal, reverse, inverse in two directions. The repetition of overlapping lines gave opportunity for emergence of shapes and their resulting relationships within a flat planar space. During the early 1990s, while based in Barcelona, Harrington interpreted a selection of these two-dimensional works as inlaid tables in hardwoods and metals.

From 1995 Harrington's paintings on canvas and linen, initially comprising oil on gesso, subsequently synthetic acrylic components, have explored possibilities of textured ground with gestural mark-making embedded in the field, not applied. The monochromatic color fields, distressed by random elements, are crossed by drawn lines continuous from edge to edge, or severed in mid-plane. The lines are not stripes: generally horizontal, varying in width and multi-tonal, they bear evidence of mingled brush and bladework.

Statements 

"My paintings address the vortex of pictorial space, emphasizing format, surface, transparency and rhythmic horizontal line. I work with diptychs in an effort to resolve two parts into a singular whole. I wish for my paintings, whether large or reduced in scale, to confront the viewer within the vertical plane while provoking the sense of liberation into an unbordered expanse."

"Mark Harrington loves the line. It runs in pulses across the canvas. Without a beginning, as though there were no fixed edge, and without an end. Line after line... Their strength varies as does their separation from each other. They are lines of force with great intensity that include the space and seem to continue along the wall."

"[...] a fundamental concept of sculpture is evident in the work. The concept of space is defined by above and below, top and bottom, before and after. With this, it appears that the paintings can also convey a notion of the inconceivable, impalpable dimension of time."

"At a time when abstract painting, indeed painting in general, seems on the wane, harrington produces paintings that validate the perpetual human act of visual denotation [...] recalling john cage’s musical compositions, (having) no beginning and no end, appearing like fragments of infinitude."

Works in Collections 

 Bakersfield Museum of Art, Bakersfield, California
 Weserburg Museum für moderne Kunst, Bremen
 Credit Suisse, Munich
 Knorr-Bremse, Munich
 Siemens, Munich
 U.C.A. Aktiengesellschaft, Munich
 Stortinget (Norwegian Parliament), Oslo
 Bomuldsfabriken Kunsthall, Arendal
 Munich Re, Singapore

Exhibitions (selection) 

 North-Paintings MH, Mackintosh Museum, Glasgow School of Art, Glasgow, 1998 (solo).
 Paintings 1999, Nordnorsk Kunstnersenter, Svolvaer, Norway, 1999 (solo).
 Work in Process, Villa Waldberta, Feldafing, 2000 (solo).
 Kontemplation und ethisches Handeln, Villa Bosch, Radolfzell, 2002.
 Mark Harrington, Malerei, Diözesanmuseum Freising, Freising, 2002 (solo).
 Mark Harrington & Jon Groom, Galeri S.E., Bergen, Norway, 2003.
 Mark Harrington, New Works, Global Art Source, Küsnacht/Zurich, 2004 (solo).
 Zyklus, Christian Dam Galleries, Oslo, 2004 (solo).
 West Coast Painting, Galerie Biedermann, Munich, 2005.
 Recent work, Christan Dam Galleries, Copenhagen, 2005 (solo).
 Tiptoe down to Art, Camera Artis, Munich, 2006.
 Bye Bye Mr. Blue Sky, Lazard, Brussels, 2007 (solo).
 Paint it Blue. ACT Art Collection Siegfried Loch, Weserburg Museum für moderne Kunst, Bremen, 2007.
 Paintings 2007, Christoph und Stephan Kaske Stiftung, Munich, 2007 (solo).
 The Shadow-line, San Jose Museum of Art, San Jose, California, 2008 (solo).
 Depth of Field I, Edward Cella Art + Architecture, Santa Barbara, California, 2009 (solo).
 Depth of Field II, Edward Cella Art + Architecture, Los Angeles, California, 2011 (solo).
 Framing abstraction: mark, symbol, signifier, Los Angeles Municipal Art Gallery, Los Angeles, California, 2011.
 Between Spaces (retrospective), Weserburg Museum für moderne Kunst, Bremen, 2011 (solo).
 Untitled Journey (retrospective), Bakersfield Museum of Art, Bakersfield, California, 2012 (solo).
 Broken-Ground, Edward Cella Art + Architecture, Los Angeles, 2013 (solo).
 Painting Black, The Sylvia Wald and Po Kim Gallery NYC, 2014.

References

Sources 

 Susanne Baumgart & Julia Lachenmann (ed.), Mark Harrington. Coast to Coast, Munich: Edition Nusser & Baumgart, 2002. 
 Petra Giloy-Hirtz (ed.), Mark Harrington. East West, Dießen am Ammersee: Edition Florian Trampler, 2005.
 Carsten Ahrens (ed.), Paint it Blue. ACT art collection Siegfried Loch, Bremen: Weserburg, Museum für moderne Kunst, 2007.
 Marlena Doktorczyk-Donahue & Peter Selz, Mabstraction: Mark, Symbol, Signifier, Los Angeles, California: City of Los Angeles Dept. of Cultural Affairs, Municipal Art Gallery, 2011.

External links 

 http://www.markharrington.net/home/
 http://www.edwardcella.com/artist/Mark_Harrington/works/#!2104
 

1952 births
20th-century American painters
Living people
People from Bakersfield, California
21st-century American painters
Alumni of Sheffield Hallam University
Alumni of the University of Reading